Noé Acosta Rivera (born 10 December 1983) is a Spanish professional footballer who plays for CA Pinto as a left midfielder.

Safe for one year in Romania with Universitatea Cluj and another in India with Jamshedpur, he spent his entire professional career in Greece, mainly with PAS Giannina.

Club career

Spain
Acosta was born in Guadalajara, Castile-La Mancha. In his country, the Real Madrid youth graduate played exclusively in the lower leagues.

Acosta started in 2002 with CD Colonia Moscardó, going on to represent Atlético Madrid C, Real Murcia Imperial, RSD Alcalá – his only Segunda División B experience, suffering team relegation at the end of the 2005–06 season – UD Almería B and Motril CF.

Romania
Acosta moved abroad in January 2010, signing with FC Universitatea Cluj from Romania. He helped them promote to Liga I, contributing 14 games and two goals to the feat.

In his second year, Acosta appeared in ten matches as his team finished in eighth position, two points ahead of neighbouring CFR Cluj. This marked his first top-flight experience, at the age of 26.

Greece
Again in the January transfer window, free agent Acosta moved to Greece in 2011, starting with Olympiacos Volou 1937 FC. He still competed in the 2011–12 UEFA Europa League with the side, scoring in a 3–0 away win against FC Differdange 03 in the third qualifying round, but moved in September to fellow Super League club Aris Thessaloniki FC.

Acosta competed in both major levels in the following years, representing Levadiakos FC, Olympiakos Volou and PAS Giannina FC. On 25 August 2015 he renewed his contract with the latter until 2017, for an undisclosed fee.

On 21 June 2017, the 33-year-old Acosta moved to newly promoted PAS Lamia 1964. For the following campaign, he joined Athlitiki Enosi Larissa F.C. also in the top tier on a one-year deal.

India
On 4 June 2019, Acosta signed a one-year contract with Indian Super League club Jamshedpur FC.

References

External links

1983 births
Living people
People from Guadalajara, Spain
Sportspeople from the Province of Guadalajara
Spanish footballers
Footballers from Castilla–La Mancha
Association football midfielders
Segunda División B players
Tercera División players
Atlético Madrid C players
Real Murcia Imperial players
RSD Alcalá players
UD Almería B players
Motril CF players
Liga I players
Liga II players
FC Universitatea Cluj players
Super League Greece players
Football League (Greece) players
Olympiacos Volos F.C. players
Aris Thessaloniki F.C. players
Levadiakos F.C. players
PAS Giannina F.C. players
PAS Lamia 1964 players
Athlitiki Enosi Larissa F.C. players
Indian Super League players
Jamshedpur FC players
Spanish expatriate footballers
Expatriate footballers in Romania
Expatriate footballers in Greece
Expatriate footballers in India
Spanish expatriate sportspeople in Romania
Spanish expatriate sportspeople in Greece
Spanish expatriate sportspeople in India